Kálmán Kittenberger (Léva, 10 October 1881 - Nagymaros, 4 January 1958) was a Hungarian traveller, natural historian, biologist and collector. He was born in Léva, now in Slovakia (Levice).

He made six travels to Africa, the first time in 1902, where he was accompanying a wealthy nobleman on a hunting trip and supported by the Hungarian National Museum in Budapest. He spent altogether ten and a half years in Africa. During his journeys he faced financial difficulties as he received no sponsorship, but he was still able to grant 60,000 items to the biological collections of the Hungarian National Museum, including 300 new animal species. (Almost 40 of them were named after Kittenberger, including Pachyonomastus kittenbergeri) Part of that collection was annihilated by a fire in 1956. On museum specimen labels his name has been altered by a department head against his will to Katona. Many of the taxonomic names dedicated to him are using this pseudonym e.g. Brachiopterna katonae or the genus Katonaia.

Selected works
 Vadász- és gyűjtőúton Kelet-Afrikában (Hunting and collecting in East-Africa, 1927, Budapest)
 A megváltozott Afrika (Changed Africa, 1930, Budapest)
 Kelet-Afrika vadonjaiban (In the wilderness of East-Africa, 1955, Budapest)
 A Kilimandzsárótól Nagymarosig (From the Kilimanjaro to Nagymaros, 1956, Budapest)
 Vadászkalandok Afrikában (Hunting adventures in Africa, 1957, Budapest)

References

1881 births
1958 deaths
People from Levice
Hungarian biologists
Hungarian scientists
Burials at Farkasréti Cemetery
20th-century biologists